Bråborg was a former Royal castle at Bråviken, Norrköping Municipality in Östergötland, Sweden. Today, a ruin is all that remains of the estate.

History 
The house was built by Queen Dowager Gunilla Bielke in 1588-1590 and she lived there after her husband, King John III of Sweden, died in 1592. Gunilla Bielke herself died at Bråborg in 1597. Bråborg was later owned by her son, duke John of Östergötland. In 1612 he married his cousin, princess Maria Elisabeth of Sweden. They both died at Bråborg in 1618. 

The building was partly destroyed in a fire in 1669, and in 1719 it was burnt down by a Russian army during the Russian Pillage of 1719-1721. The army also attacked the nearby town of Norrköping. The inhabitants needed stone to rebuild their town and used building material from the ruins of Bråborg.

The foundations and cellars are still visible today, together with the moats and parts of the gardens.

See also

List of castles in Sweden

Castles in Östergötland County
Ruined castles in Sweden
Royal residences in Sweden